Lasiopogon is the scientific name of two genera of organisms and may refer toL

Lasiopogon (fly), a genus of insects in the family Asilidae
Lasiopogon (plant), a genus of plants in the family Asteraceae